Yang Qiu may refer to:

 Yang Qiu (Fangzheng) (陽球), style name Fangzheng (方正), Eastern Han Dynasty official, see Book of the Later Han
 Yang Qiu (warlord) (楊秋), Eastern Han Dynasty warlord who sided with Ma Chao in the Battle of Tong Pass (211)